Sail sign can refer to:
 Sail sign of the elbow
 Sail sign of the chest